Bryan Woodward (born August 3, 1974) is an American former middle distance runner who competed in the 2000 Summer Olympics. He was born in Long Beach, California.

References

1974 births
Living people
American male middle-distance runners
Olympic track and field athletes of the United States
Athletes (track and field) at the 2000 Summer Olympics
Universiade medalists in athletics (track and field)
Universiade gold medalists for the United States
Medalists at the 1997 Summer Universiade
Long Beach Polytechnic High School alumni